Nitrosomonas halophila is an ammonia-oxidizing, aerobe, Gram-negative bacterium from the genus of Nitrosomonas. Nitrosomonas halophila uses the enzyme Ammonia monooxygenase.

References 

Gram-negative bacteria
Nitrosomonadaceae
Bacteria described in 2001